Vialonga is a town and civil parish in the municipality of Vila Franca de Xira, Portugal. Its population in 2021 was 21,261.

History 

The land where present-day Vialonga stands was occupied by humans in prehistoric ages, as evidenced by the dolmen cemeteries in Monte Serves and Casal do Penedo in the Vialonga parish. Other prehistoric religious objects, ornaments, metallic weapons and ceramics have been found in the area.

It is believed that the settlement in this area comes from the times of Moorish rule in the Iberian Peninsula. Over the centuries, the settlement had various subtle changes in its name: Vila Longa, Vila-Longa, Via Longa, Via-Longa, until the current form "Vialonga".

In 1852, the civil parish of Vialonga was integrated in the Olivais municipality. After a restructuring of the Lisbon municipality in 1886, Vialonga became part of the Vila Franca de Xira municipality.

On 12 July 1985, the locality of Forte da Casa, until then part of the Vialonga parish, became a new civil parish. On 24 September 1985, Vialonga was promoted to the category of town (vila).

In November 2014, Vialonga was one of the locations most affected by a Legionella outbreak in the Vila Franca de Xira municipality.

References

External links 

 Junta de Freguesia Vialonga (in Portuguese)

Freguesias of Vila Franca de Xira